Mount Toyoni may refer to:
 Mount Toyoni (Urakawa-Hiroo) is a mountain in the Hidaka Mountains on the border between Urakawa and Hiroo in Hokkaidō
 Mount Toyoni (Erimo) is a mountain in the Hidaka Mountains in Erimo, Hokkaidō